The 1972 Miami Redskins football team was an American football team that represented Miami University in the Mid-American Conference (MAC) during the 1972 NCAA University Division football season. In their fourth season under head coach Bill Mallory, Miami compiled a 7–3 record (2–3 against MAC opponents), finished in a tie for fourth place in the MAC, and outscored all opponents by a combined total of 207 to 117. The team's defense allowed only 11.7 points per game, which ranked 12th among 128 NCAA University Division football teams.

The team's statistical leaders included quarterback Steve Williams with 676 passing yards, tailback Bob Hitchens with 1,370 rushing yards, and John Viher with 414 receiving yards.

Hitchens won the Miami most valuable player award and the MAC Offensive Player of the Year award. Mike Poff and Bob Williams were the team captains.

Schedule

References

Miami
Miami RedHawks football seasons
Miami Redskins football